Zodarion arachnaio is a spider species found in Greece.

See also
 List of Zodariidae species

References

External links

arachnaio
Fauna of Greece
Spiders of Europe
Spiders described in 2009